Danny Dunn and the Weather Machine is the fourth novel in the Danny Dunn series of juvenile science fiction/adventure books written by Raymond Abrashkin and Jay Williams. The book was first published in 1959 and originally illustrated by Ezra Jack Keats.

Plot introduction 
Danny accidentally discovers that an ionic transmitter Professor Bulfinch has been working on can be used to create miniature rainclouds.

Reception
Floyd C. Gale of Galaxy Science Fiction rated the book four stars out of five for children: "The authors reap plenty of humor ... meanwhile sowing a considerable amount of meteorological knowledge in the process".

Editions 
McGraw-Hill
 (Paperback, 1959, illustrated by Ezra Jack Keats)
 (Hardback, 1959, illustrated by Ezra Jack Keats)

MacDonald and Jane's
  (Hardback, 1975, illustrated by Anne Mieke)

Pocket Books/Archway Books
  (Paperback, 1979, #10 in their series, illustrated by Ezra Jack Keats)
  (Paperback, 1983 reissue, illustrated by Ezra Jack Keats)

References

Danny Dunn
1959 American novels
1959 children's books
1959 science fiction novels